Bibiani is a town and capital of the Bibiani/Anhwiaso/Bekwai Municipal Assembly, a Municipality within the Western North Region of Ghana.

References  

Populated places in the Western North Region